Dubravica is a municipality in Zagreb County, Croatia. According to the 2001 census, there are 1,586 inhabitants, absolute majority of which are Croats.

Geography 
Dubravica municipality is located in the northwestern part of Zagreb County.

From the north it borders with the Krapina-Zagorje County and Municipality Kraljevec na Sutli, the Municipality of Luka and the city of Zaprešić, the Southeast Pušća Municipality, on the south by the Municipality of Marija Gorica, while the west washes the Sutla river where is the border with Slovenia.

In the west, the municipality covers a large part of the fertile valley, and its eastern parts are picturesque gentle hills of Zagorje and Prigorje.

Origin of name 
The name Dubravica itself originates from an oak forest Dubrava, which was once covered the entire area, and even today it is not uncommon to find a typical forest plants such as wood anemone, or saffron, and the occasional oak tree in the meadows in the valley of the river Sutla.

Settlements 
 Bobovec Rozganski
 Donji Čemehovec
 Dubravica
 Kraj Gornji
 Lugarski Breg
 Lukavec Sutlanski
 Pologi
 Prosinec
 Rozga
 Vučilčevo

Austro-hungarian 1910 census
According to the 1910 census, municipality of Dubravica had 2,448 inhabitants, which were linguistically and religiously declared as this:

Notable people from Dubravica 
 Pavao Štoos, a Croatian poet, priest and a revivalist, born in Dubravica

References

External links 

 

 
Populated places in Zagreb County
Zaprešić
Municipalities of Croatia